Barmouth Lifeboat Station, based in Barmouth, Gwynedd, Wales, was established in the 1820s and the first lifeboat station was constructed in 1828 at a cost of £95. The station currently (2019) operates a Shannon-class all-weather lifeboat and a D-class (IB1) inflatable. 

The early lifeboats were powered by oars, commencing with a six-oar 26ft Palmer type which served until the early 1850s. This was replaced in 1852 by an 8-oar boat, which was lengthened in 1859 and converted to 12 oars, at which time the lifeboat station was moved to its current location. That boat was replaced in turn by the Ellen, a double banked  10-oar vessel. In 1885 the Jones-Gibb, with 12 oars double-banked, was in service until 1905, followed by a second Jones-Gibb until 1939.

The current lifeboat station was built in 2004 at a cost of £1.23m. A new Shannon-class all-weather lifeboat arrived in March 2019, to be named Ella Larsen later in the year. During the lifetime of the station thirteen awards for bravery have been presented.

Barmouth is an RNLI "Explore" category station whereby, subject to operational requirements and availability of staff, visitors can look around the station. An RNLI Visitors' Centre and gift shop is also housed within the building.

All-weather boats

Inshore lifeboats

See also
List of RNLI stations

References 

Lifeboat stations in Wales
Transport in Gwynedd
Buildings and structures in Gwynedd
Barmouth